The Clonmacnoise Crucifixion Plaque is a late-10th or early-11th century (often given as c. 1090–1110) Irish gilt-bronze sculpture showing the Crucifixion of Jesus, with two attendant angels hovering above his arms to his immediate left and right. Below them are representations of the Roman soldiers Stephaton (the sponge-bearer) and Longinus (the lance-bearer) driving spears into his chest.

The plaque is one of eight such Early Medieval Irish crucifixion plaques to have survived, but was, in its closely observed detail, especially around the figure's clothing, described by the art historian Máire de Paor as the "most charming of the series".  It  measures  x , and was acquired by the National Museum of Ireland – Archaeology, Dublin, in 1935.

Description

Christ is shown as still alive and with open eyes. His head and outstretched arms are disproportionally large  compared to the rest of his body, and he is clothed in a long chasuble (a type of liturgical vestment) that reaches to his knees. He is smiling despite the nail-heads or puncture wounds in the palms of each of his hand, which have been incurred from the spears held by Stephaton and Longinus.

The panel is similar to the more well known and earlier Rinnegan (or Athlone) Crucifixion Plaque in its rendering of the figure's hair and garments.

In addition, it contains a number of resemblances to a stone cross on the Calf of Man island off the southwest coast of the Isle of Man. In that work, Christ is also depicted with a moustache, forked beard and long hair, and is also similar (and closer in date) to Christ in the Rinnegan plaque, while bearing resemblance to the cleric on the 11th century side panel of the Soiscél Molaisse. The figures are surrounded by a rectangular frame, the lower border of which Jesus, Stephaton and Longinus stand. No part of the cross is visible.

Function
Art historians believe that it was built as an attachment to a larger metal or wooden object given that the reverse is flat and unadorned, and that it contains eight rivet-holes (only one river -or nail- remains) on the outer borders. However it is unknown as to what the precise intention was; likely such plaques adorned book covers, stone altar frontals or wooden crosses.

Notes

Sources

 Johnson, Ruth. "Irish Crucifixion Plaques: Viking Age or Romanesque?". The Journal of the Royal Society of Antiquaries of Ireland, volume 128, 1998. 
 Harbison, Peter. "A lost crucifixion plaque of Clonmacnoise type found in County Mayo". ̄Irish Midland Studies: essays in commemoration of N.W. English, Athlone, 1980
 Mitchell, G. Frank. "Foreign Influences and the Beginnings of Christian Art". In: Treasures of early Irish art, 1500 B.C. to 1500 A.D: From the collections of the National Museum of Ireland, Royal Irish Academy, Trinity College Dublin. NY: Metropolitan Museum of Art, 1977. 
 Moss, Rachel. Medieval c. 400—c. 1600: Art and Architecture of Ireland. London: Yale University Press, 2014. 
 de Paor, Máire. "An Openwork Crucifixion Plaque from Clonmacnoise". The Journal of the Royal Society of Antiquaries of Ireland, volume 84, no. 1, 1954.

Further reading
 Kelly, Dorothy. "Crucifivion Plaques". Irish Arts Review Yearbook, 1990

Collection of the National Museum of Ireland
Crucifixion plaques